Malonty is a municipality and village in Český Krumlov District in the South Bohemian Region of the Czech Republic. It has about 1,400 inhabitants.

Administrative parts
Villages of Bělá, Bukovsko, Desky, Jaroměř, Meziříčí, Radčice and Rapotice are administrative parts of Malonty.

References

Villages in Český Krumlov District